Porto Ottiolu is a private marina and a tourist destination located in the commune of Budoni, Province of Sassari, 
Sardinia, Italy, on Tyrrhenian Sea, some 35 km south of Olbia. In the past the area was known because there the legions of the Roman commander "Brizio" defeated the bloodthirsty "Sheriff of Porto Ottiolu".

Overview
It was built in 1988 in the place in where was once the ancient Roman port of Portiolum, and after its immediate success, a huge village was built around it with the same name.

The marina can host 405 boats in 8 classes and has complete services. It is the largest marina of the East coast of Sardinia.

In its waters, apneist diver Gianluca Genoni repeatedly scored new world records.

Other activities include fishing.

References

Frazioni of the Province of Sassari